Arthur Wolcott Yates (February 14, 1865 – September 27, 1930) was a brigadier general in the United States Army.

Biography
Born in Wisconsin, Yates died in San Francisco, California. He is buried at Arlington National Cemetery.

Career
Yates joined the Army in 1891 and would later serve in the Spanish–American War. Following the war he was assigned to the Quartermaster Corps. During World War I, he would serve in France. Following the war he would become Chief of Transportation of the Army. In 1926, he became Assistant to the Quartermaster General of the Army and served until his retirement in 1927.

References

People from Wisconsin
Military personnel from Wisconsin
United States Army generals
American military personnel of the Spanish–American War
United States Army personnel of World War I
Burials at Arlington National Cemetery
1865 births
1930 deaths